Woolwich East by-election may refer to one of two by-elections held for the British House of Commons constituency of Woolwich East:

1921 Woolwich East by-election
1931 Woolwich East by-election
1951 Woolwich East by-election

See also
Woolwich East (UK Parliament constituency)
Woolwich West by-election (disambiguation)